The twenty-third series of the British medical drama television series Casualty commenced airing in the United Kingdom on BBC One on 13 September 2008, and concluded on 1 August 2009.

Cast

Main characters 
Matt Bardock as Jeff Collier
Ivana Basic as Snezana Lalovic (until episode 31)
Charles Dale as Big Mac
Sophia Di Martino as Polly Emmerson (from episode 29)
Michael French as Nick Jordan (episodes 3−48)
Tristan Gemmill as Adam Trueman
Sam Grey as Alice Chantrey
Jane Hazlegrove as Kathleen "Dixie" Dixon
Gillian Kearney as Jessica Harrison
Tony Marshall as Noel Garcia
Janine Mellor as Kelsey Phillips (until episode 31)
Matthew Needham as Toby De Silva (until episode 19)
Suzanne Packer as Tess Bateman
James Redmond as John "Abs" Denham (until episode 7)
Abdul Salis as Curtis Cooper (until episode 48)
Sunetra Sarker as Zoe Hanna
Georgia Taylor as Ruth Winters
Derek Thompson as Charlie Fairhead
Ben Turner as Jay Faldren (from episode 8)

Recurring characters 
Adrianna Bertola as Sharice Brooks (episodes 8−35)
Tom Chadbon as Henry Williams (from episode 1)
Richard Dillane as Sean Anderson (episodes 14−47)
Danny Emes as Lucas Anderson
Miffy Englefield as Amelia Anderson
Caroline Langrishe as Marilyn Fox (until episode 11)
Mark Letheren as Ben Harding (episodes 3−19)
Amy Manson as Abby Evans (episodes 8−20)
Joseph Morgan as Tony Reece (episodes 8−39)
Andrew Newton-Lee as Stacey Merrick (until episode 4)
Sarah-Jane Potts as Ellie Bridges (until episode 7)

Guest characters 
Susan Cookson as Maggie Coldwell (episode 31)
Sharon Duce as Sheila Denham (episodes 3 and 6)
Gregory Foreman as Louis Fairhead (episode 27)

Episodes

Notes

References

External links
 Casualty series 23 at the Internet Movie Database

23
2008 British television seasons
2009 British television seasons